Prince Janusz Franciszek Radziwiłł (3 September 1880 – 4 October 1967) was a Polish nobleman and politician.

Early life
Prince Radziwiłł was born on 3 September 1880 in Berlin in the then German Empire.  He was the son of Prince Ferdynand Radziwiłł (1834–1926) and Princess Pelagia Sapieha-Kodenska. His siblings were Michał Radziwiłł Rudy, Karol Ferdynand Radziwiłł, Małgorzata.

His paternal grandparents were Prince Ferdynand Radziwiłł and Countess Leontyna von Clary und Aldringen.  His maternal grandparents were Prince Léon Sapieha-Kodenski and Countess Johanna Tyszkiewicz.  His great-grandfather was Prince Anton Radziwill and his great-grandmother was Princess Louise of Prussia (1770–1836).

Career
He was a member of the government of the Kingdom of Poland and a conservative politician in the Second Polish Republic. From 1919 to 1920, he was the Polish envoy to London and served as the Polish Foreign Minister from 1920 to 1921.

He was a supporter of Józef Piłsudski, member of his BBWR coalition, Sejm deputy from 1928 to 1935 and a member of the Polish Senate from 1935 to 1939.  Despite being a supporter of the government, he was critical of sanacja's excesses (persecution of political opponents, censorship). In 1937 he joined the Camp of National Unity (OZON).

After the Soviet invasion of Poland in 1939, he was arrested by NKVD. Imprisoned in the infamous Lubyanka prison, he was personally interrogated by Lavrentiy Beria. He was released after a few months after international pressure from, among others, the Italian royal family (due to the prestige of the Radziwiłł family). He returned to Nazi occupied Poland, where he tried to use his prestige to improve Nazi treatment of the Poles; he met with Hermann Göring (whom he knew from before the war) but his efforts were futile.  He was briefly imprisoned by the Germans during the Warsaw Uprising in 1944.

After the war in 1945 he was again arrested by NKVD; his wife would die in a communist prison in 1947. He was eventually released, with most of his possessions confiscated and nationalized by the communist government.  In 1959, the Polish government gave the 77 year old a passport to visit his son and daughter in England and Spain.

Personal life
On 9 December 1905, Radziwiłł was married to Princess Anna Jadwiga Maria Lubomirska (1882-1947) (1882-1947) in Rowno, Poland. She was the daughter of Prince Stanislaw Lubomirski and Princess Wanda Lubomirska. Together, they were the parents of:

 Prince Edmund Ferdynand Radziwiłł (b. 1906), who married Princess Izabella Radziwiłł (b. 1915), daughter of Prince Charles Radziwiłł and Princess Izabella Radziwiłł, on 2 June 1934.
 Princess Krystyna Maria Radziwiłł (b. 1908), who married Count Józef Potocki (1895–1968), son of Count Józef Potocki and Princess Helena Radziwiłł, on 8 October 1930.  Prince Potocki was the Polish exile government's Ambassador to Spain. 
 Prince Ludwik Ferdynand Radziwiłł (1911–1928), who died at the age of 16 at Pszczyna, Germany.
 Prince Stanisław Albrecht Radziwiłł (1914–1976), who was married three times, lastly to Caroline Lee Bouvier Canfield (1933-2019), sister of American First Lady Jacqueline Kennedy.

Radziwiłł died in his two-room apartment in Warsaw, Poland on 4 October 1967,  Before the War, he owned two palaces in Warsaw.  He was buried in Poland.

References

External links
 Prince Janusz Radziwill on the Peerage.com

Ancestry

1880 births
1967 deaths
Diplomats from Berlin
Janusz 1880
Polish people of German descent
Nonpartisan Bloc for Cooperation with the Government politicians
Camp of National Unity politicians
Members of the Sejm of the Second Polish Republic (1928–1930)
Members of the Sejm of the Second Polish Republic (1930–1935)
Senators of the Second Polish Republic (1935–1938)
Diplomats of the Second Polish Republic
Prisoners and detainees of Poland
Polish people detained by the NKVD
Prisoners and detainees of the Soviet Union
Polish deportees to Soviet Union